Dato' Megat Yunus bin Megat Mohd Isa was a Malaysian politician.

He was born in 1907. His parents were Megat Mohd Isa Bin Megat Ismail and Wan Rasiah Binti Temenggong Wan Hussain of Kota Lama Kanan, Kuala Kangsar, Perak.

He was conferred the title Orang Kaya Besar Maharaja Diraja of Perak - one of the Four Major Chiefs (Orang Besar Empat) of Perak. He was one of the signatories to the Perak State Constitution of 1948. He was also one of the founding members of the United Malays National Organisation (UMNO) - Perak Branch, together with the late Dato' Seri Dr Megat Khas and the late Dato' Panglima Bukit Gantang Abdul Wahab.

He died in 1964 and was buried in the compound of the Kota Lama Kanan Mosque, Kuala Kangsar. One of his sons, Dato' Seri Megat Jaafar Bin Megat Yunus, inherited the Orang Kaya Besar title in 1985.

1907 births
1964 deaths
Malaysian people of Malay descent
Malaysian Muslims
United Malays National Organisation politicians